Taymuraz Muratovich Toboyev (born 9 March 1995) is a Russian football midfielder who plays for Kazakh club FC Okzhetpes.

Career
Toboyev made his debut in the Russian Football National League for FC SKA-Energiya Khabarovsk on 23 August 2013 in a game against FC Gazovik Orenburg.

On 26 June 2019, Ararat Yerevan announced the signing of Toboyev, along with 12 other players, before leaving Ararat Yerevan on 16 January 2020.
On 4 February 2020, Urartu announced the signing of Toboyev. On 13 July 2020, Toboyev left Urartu by mutual agreement.

Career statistics

Club

References

External links
 
 

1995 births
Living people
Russian footballers
Russian expatriate footballers
Sportspeople from Vladikavkaz
Association football midfielders
FC SKA-Khabarovsk players
FC Mika players
Expatriate footballers in Georgia (country)
FC Guria Lanchkhuti players
FC Spartak Vladikavkaz players
FC Ararat Moscow players
FC Ararat Yerevan players
FC Dynamo Stavropol players
FC Salyut Belgorod players
FC Mashuk-KMV Pyatigorsk players
FC Kyran players
FC Okzhetpes players
Russian expatriate sportspeople in Armenia
Russian expatriate sportspeople in Kazakhstan
Expatriate footballers in Armenia
Expatriate footballers in Kazakhstan